Kamila Ainievna Badurova (born 10 August 1995) is a Russian judoka. of volga tatar heritage.

She participated at the 2018 World Judo Championships, winning a medal.

References

External links

 
 

1995 births
Living people
Russian female judoka
Universiade medalists in judo
Universiade silver medalists for Russia
Universiade bronze medalists for Russia
Medalists at the 2019 Summer Universiade
21st-century Russian women